Brusa may refer to:

Places
 Brusa, historical name of the city Bursa in Turkey
 Brusa, historical name of Prusa (Bithynia) (modern Bursa, Turkey)

People with the surname
 Anselme Brusa (1899–1969), Italian-Swiss-French rower
 Elisabetta Brusa (born 1954), Italian composer

Other uses
 1943 BRUSA Agreement between the British and American governments in cypher cracking
 Brusa (butterfly), a genus of butterfly in the grass skipper family

See also

Bursa (disambiguation)